Jisk'a Pata (Aymara jisk'a small, pata stone bench, step,  "little stone step", Hispanicized spelling Jiskha Pata) is a  mountain in the Cordillera Real in the Andes of Bolivia. It is located in the La Paz Department, Los Andes Province, Batallas Municipality, Kirani Canton. It is situated between the mountains Jallawaya in the west and Janq'u Uyu in the south-east, north of Warawarani, Wila Lluxi and Phaq'u Kiwuta, all of them higher than 5,000 m.

See also
 Kunturiri
 Q'ara Quta
 List of mountains in the Andes

References 

Mountains of La Paz Department (Bolivia)